Baix Maestrat is a coastal comarca located in the north of the province of Castellón, Valencian Community, Spain. The capital of the comarca is Vinaròs.

Municipalities 
The comarca is composed of 18 municipalities, listed below with their surface areas, their populations at the 2011 Census and according to the latest official estimates (for i January 2019) and their population density in 2019:

Data from National Institute of Statistics 2019

Geography 

The comarca borders to the north-west with the province of Teruel (Aragon), to the north-east with the province of Tarragona (Catalonia), to the east with the Mediterranean Sea, to the south with the comarca of Plana Alta (Castellón, Valencia) and to the west with the comarcas of Alt Maestrat (Castellón, Valencia) and Els Ports (Castellón, Valencia).

Within the comarca lies Serra d'Irta, an 18.8 km long mountain range and the largest undeveloped coastal area within the Valencian Community. The range includes the Natural Park of Serra d'Irta, which was declared a protected area by the Valencian Regional Government on July 16, 2002.

Economic activities 

The area's traditional economic activities include agriculture (citrus fruits, olive trees, artichokes) and fishing. Artichokes from Benicarló are covered by a geographic designation of origin.

Historical delimitations 

The current comarca of Baix Maestrat also includes the historical subcomarcas of Tinença de Benifassà and Plana de Vinaròs. The localities of Albocàsser and Tírig (today located in Alt Maestrat), and Les Coves de Vinromà, Sarratella, La Torre d'en Doménec, and Vilanova d'Alcolea (in Plana Alta), were also formerly part of the historic comarca.

See also
Tinença de Benifassà

References

 
Comarques of the Valencian Community
Geography of the Province of Castellón
Maestrazgo